Bidkhun may refer to:
Bidkhun-e Morghak
Bidkhun, Kerman